Thomas "Tom" Albertrani (born March 21, 1958, in Brooklyn, New York) is an American Thoroughbred racehorse trainer. He began his career as a jockey then spent a number of years as an assistant to trainer Bill Mott. In 1995 Albertrani was hired as an assistant to head trainer Saeed bin Suroor at the prominent international Godolphin Racing stable based in Dubai in the United Arab Emirates. After working for Godolphin and the Maktoum family's related Darley Racing operations in Dubai, Australia, Japan and at various race tracks throughout Europe, in 2005 Albertrani returned to the New York City area and in addition to conditioning horses for Darley, he opened a public stable to take on horses from various owners.

In 2006, Albertrani won the Tampa Bay and Ohio Derbys with Joseph LaCombe's Deputy Glitters and with Darley Racing's colt, Bernardini, he won five consecutive stakes races including the Preakness and Travers Stakes and the Jockey Club Gold Cup. That year he was voted a share of the Red Smith "Good Guy" Award with fellow trainer, Kiaran McLaughlin.

His brother, Louis Albertrani, is also a Thoroughbred trainer.

References
 Tom Albertrani at the NTRA

1958 births
Living people
American horse trainers
Sportspeople from Brooklyn